Fejiro Okiomah (born November 10, 1990) is an American soccer player. He is the brother of fellow professional soccer player Karo Okiomah.

Career

College & Amateur
Okiomah played four years of college soccer at High Point University. During his time at college, Okiomah also played for USL PDL club Carolina Dynamo from 2009 to 2012.

Professional career
Okiomah signed with USL Pro club Charlotte Eagles in April 2013. In his first professional season Okiomah appeared in 26 league matches for the Eagles.

References

1990 births
Living people
American sportspeople of Nigerian descent
American soccer players
High Point Panthers men's soccer players
North Carolina Fusion U23 players
Charlotte Eagles players
Indy Eleven players
Pittsburgh Riverhounds SC players
San Antonio FC players
Association football defenders
Soccer players from Austin, Texas
USL League Two players
USL Championship players
North American Soccer League players